Zhenjiang railway station is a railway station of Beijing–Shanghai railway and Shanghai–Nanjing intercity railway. The station is located in Zhenjiang, Jiangsu, China.

History 
The original Zhenjiang railway station opened in 1908, as part of the Shanghai–Nanjing railway. In 1977, to handle increasing passenger load, the station was relocated to a new site on the west side of the city.

In May 2010, simultaneously with the opening of the Shanghai–Nanjing intercity railway (whose tracks, in Zhenjiang area, closely parallel those of the original Shanghai–Nanjing railway), the new Zhenjiang railway station was opened on the southern side of the tracks, opposite the old railway station, which is north of the tracks  As of the early 2011, the old railway station serves all the non-CRH trains (i.e., the conventional T, K, and slower trains) as well as some of the CRH D-series trains; the new railway station serves the Shanghai–Nanjing intercity railway trains (i.e., all G-series trains) as well as most of the D-series trains. There is a long underground pedestrian passage connecting the northern and southern railway stations' plazas.

The Zhenjiang railway station serves as an important rail gateway for the nearby city of Yangzhou, which, due to its location on a little-served railway branch (Nanjing–Qidong railway), only sees a few trains a day. The Coach Station with frequent service to Yangzhou (and other nearby cities) is adjacent to the new Zhenjiang railway station.

References

Railway stations in Jiangsu
Railway stations in China opened in 1908
Stations on the Shanghai–Nanjing Intercity Railway
Stations on the Beijing–Shanghai Railway
Railway stations in Zhenjiang